SET and MYND domain-containing protein 4 is a protein that in humans is encoded by the SMYD4 gene.

Model organisms

Model organisms have been used in the study of SMYD4 function. A conditional knockout mouse line, called Smyd4tm1a(EUCOMM)Wtsi was generated as part of the International Knockout Mouse Consortium program — a high-throughput mutagenesis project to generate and distribute animal models of disease to interested scientists — at the Wellcome Trust Sanger Institute.

Male and female animals underwent a standardized phenotypic screen to determine the effects of deletion. Twenty six tests were carried out on homozygous mutant adult mice, however no significant abnormalities were observed.

References

Further reading

Genes mutated in mice